Osselle-Routelle is a commune in the Doubs department of eastern France. The municipality was established on 1 January 2016 and consists of the former communes of Osselle and Routelle.

See also 
Communes of the Doubs department

References 

Communes of Doubs